William Wilkinson Wardell (1823–1899) was a civil engineer and architect, notable not only for his work in Australia, the country to which he emigrated in 1858, but for a successful career as a surveyor and ecclesiastical architect in England and Scotland before his departure.

In Australia, Wardell designed many public buildings. Most notable were St Patrick's Cathedral, Melbourne; Government House, Melbourne; St John's College, University of Sydney and St Mary's Cathedral, Sydney. He worked in both the Gothic and classical styles. Wardell not only constructed major works in the public sector, he also maintained a large private practice building houses and business premises for private individuals. He was Inspector-General of Public Works and Building, for the Colony of Victoria, from 1861 until 1878. As an architect he is often compared with his friend and English counterpart Augustus Pugin, with the vast majority of his buildings completed in the Gothic Revival architectural style.

Early life in London 
Wardell was born in 1823; his birth date is not recorded, but he was baptised the following year, on 3 March 1824. As a young man, Wardell studied under the Gothic architect Augustus Pugin. Pugin became his friend and mentor, and was to inspire him not only in architecture but also in his religious convictions. Mixed in the artistic and literary circles of London, he fell in with the philosophies of the Oxford and Cambridge movement, which taught (amongst other things) that Gothic architecture, as symbolized by the great medieval cathedrals of England, was the only form of architecture worthy of God and fostered a spirituality that made it easier to communicate with God. In 1843 Wardell made the then conventionally unusual decision to convert from Anglicanism to Roman Catholicism, adopting the motto "Inveni Quod Quaesivi"( "I have found that which I sought"). This would have been a very difficult decision to make at the time; while Catholics were not actively persecuted in Britain at the time, there was still open discrimination against the Faith in certain political and business quarters. The leader of the Oxford movement, John Henry Newman, did not himself make the leap of faith until 1845.

Wardell's conversion to the Roman Catholic faith was the result of a period of deep internal reflection. This affiliation to a more high church ritual was manifested in his architectural interests which concentrated on the more Gothic designs of England's medieval architecture. For the remainder of his life he saw architecture as a means of praising God. He always had a room in his home set aside as a chapel for personal devotion which he visited several times during the course of a day. Dominating this room was an ancient carved wooden French cross that now belongs to the Melbourne Diocesan Historical Commission, who also own several other mementos of his personal devotion. Wardell also wrote, in particular two prayers devoted to the Virgin Mary, who he seems to have regarded as his especial saint. It is known that he frequently prayed for help and guidance when working on plans of church buildings.

On 7 October 1847 Wardell married Lucy Ann Butler, the daughter of William Henry Butler, a wine merchant and one time Mayor of Oxford. The couple married at St. Mary's Catholic Church, Moorfields in the City of London and are known to have had eleven children.

Architectural career

London office

By the time of his marriage aged 23, Wardell was already independently practicing as an architect. Between 1846 and 1858 he designed, restored or re-ordered about 30 churches in the UK, a rapid success. As this was an era of massive church restoration (Nikolaus Pevsner has said many churches were "over-restored" during this time) it is possible that this high figure may include churches Wardell only redesigned or restored. Whatever the true number of churches he designed in England, this was a period not only of church restoration but also building of many new Roman Catholic Churches. Wardell's work wasn't just limited to England though. He was commissioned by Robert Hope-Scott and his wife, of Abbotsford, Melrose, to build a church for the growing Roman Catholic community in the nearby town of Galashiels, Scotland. The designs drawn, work began in 1856 and wouldn't be completed for another 20 years. Our Lady & Saint Andrew's is still in use as the Parish Church to this day. Wardell and John Newman were by no means the only converts to Catholicism; a large number of notable intellectuals too changed their faith. This, coupled with the greater freedom Catholics obtained by the Catholic Emancipation Act which restored the hierarchy and removed some of the prohibitions on Catholics which had prevailed since the time of the reformation, led to the Catholic Church having a revival in Britain. Thus the newly converted Pugin and his protégé Wardell were well placed to receive the numerous commissions which came flooding in.

The heritage-listed Church of St Birinus in Bridge End, Dorchester-on-Thames, Oxfordshire was constructed between 1846 and 1849. This church was one of the first Roman Catholic churches built following the passing of the 1839 Catholic Emancipation Act. The small and simple building is an almost exact replica of a 14th-century Gothic chapel. It is constructed of Littlemore stone with a Caen stone porch. The interior has rectangular nave leading in the traditional fashion through a rood screen to a smaller and lower ceilinged chancel. The nave has a vaulted ceiling supported by wooden strapwork. Lit by stained glass windows, the whole structure hardly differs from the design of Anglican churches constructed in the same period. The expected paraphernalia of the more ritualistic Catholic worship is absent; side chapels and numerous secondary altars are conspicuous by their absence. The only contemporary jarring feature not found in an English country church is the set of late Byzantine style gilt chandeliers.

He designed several London churches. Another heritage-listed church is Our Ladye Star of the Sea, Greenwich, a Gothic Revival church begun in 1846 and completed . It is surmounted by a tower completed by an ornate spire which in turn is complemented by the smaller spire of the adjacent stair turret. The church has remarkable architectural similarities to Wardell's later and largest work, St. Patrick's Cathedral in Melbourne. Also heritage-listed is Our Immaculate Lady of Victories (also known as St. Mary's Church), situated in Clapham Park Road, Clapham, South London, constructed between 1848 and 1851, the same year that Wardell completed Holy Trinity, Hammersmith. Other Grade II* listed heritage buildings designed in part or full by Wardell include the Church of St Mary and St Michael in the London Borough of Tower Hamlets; the Roman Catholic Church of St Peter and St Edward in Palace Street, Westminster; the Gate Lodge and Gateway, the Training College, the Priory, the former convent building, and the chapel at the former convent of the Holy Child Jesus on Magdalen Road in Hastings; Ellingham, a house in Thanet, Kent; the Old Lodge and Chapel of the Sacred Heart of Digby Stuart College; a lodge at Grove House in the London Borough of Wandsworth; the Spode Pottery including buildings around the north west courtyard, including the entrance gate, gate piers and remains of the bottle kiln at Stoke-on-Trent; and a chantry chapel for family burials commissioned by Lord Petre at Thorndon Park, near Brentwood, Essex, his last completed work in England.

By 1858, aged 35, Wardell was in poor health, and felt that the warmer climate of Australia would be more beneficial to his health. Obtaining the position of "Government Architect" to the city of Melbourne in Victoria, Australia, Wardell and his family emigrated.

In Melbourne 

Melbourne in the early 1850s was a rough and primitive place with potholed roads. Robbery was commonplace, and the poverty caused by the soaring inflation, and streets that were in 1854 described as open sewers ensured that disease was rife. It was into this environment came men seeking fortunes digging for gold. Within ten years the gold rush had transformed Melbourne from a provincial outpost of the British Empire to a wealthy and rapidly expanding city. Between 1853 and 1854 Melbourne doubled in size, however many of its new and expanding population lived in tented villages within the city. This need for building coupled with available funding drew aspiring young architects from around the world, among them John James Clark, Peter Kerr and in William Wilkinson Wardell.

As the newly arrived and appointed Government Architect, Wardell immediately began work on St Patrick's Cathedral, a task which was to occupy him for much of his life. In 1867 the Wardell Family moved into a large new house known as Ardoch, at 226 Dandenong Road, St Kilda, at the time one of the smartest and most expensive residential areas of Melbourne. The 13-roomed two-storied house in an Italianate style was built for £225 in 1864. The Wardell family purchased it in 1867 and moved from their previous home in Powlett Street, East Melbourne. Wardell designed both the Catholic churches dedicated to St Mary in St Kilda East where he personally worshipped. The first was completed in 1859 and its larger replacement completed in 1897.

In Melbourne, Wardell was not only the state-employed Government Architect, but also had a flourishing private practice as well, building houses, shops, and business premises for all who could afford him. He did not work in any one exclusive style, and could design in any architectural form his patrons required - Palladian, Neoclassical plus the various forms of Gothic, including notably at the ANZ Bank the floral Venetian Gothic.

In 1877 Sir Graham Berry became the premier of Victoria. His mission, considered radically left wing at the time, was to redistribute the grazing land of Victoria, and to introduce a bill providing for the payment of members of the Legislative Assembly, which would enable working-class candidates to be elected. When his aims were rejected by the Legislative Council, he embarked on a public campaign of "coercion". "We coerce madmen," he said, "we put them into lunatic asylums, and never was anything more the act of madmen than the rejection of the Appropriation Bill." On 8 January 1878, known afterwards as "Black Wednesday", his "coercing" began. Using the reasoning that without his bill civil servants could not be paid, Berry began to dismiss public servants, starting with police and judges. Wardell's was one of the many heads which fell - dismissed from office, he left Melbourne to seek employment in Sydney.

During his time in Melbourne, Wardell designed numerous buildings, including 14 parish churches, in both the private and public sectors. While St Patrick's Cathedral is the largest and best known, other notable buildings are listed below.

St Patrick's Cathedral

St Patrick's Cathedral is the tallest and largest church in Australia, and a fine example of Gothic Revival.

It was the third church designed for the site. Bishop James Alipius Goold commissioned the first in 1850, delayed by labour shortages caused by the Gold rush, and in 1858; he then laid the foundation stone for a second, larger, church partly completed by 1858, when he instructed the newly arrived Wardell to design a cathedral, incorporating as much as possible of the partly completed church, and in December 1858 the new plans were accepted and work commenced.

Wardell's design is a fine essay in the mid 19th century Gothic Revival style, drawing inspiration from the mediaeval cathedrals of Europe and England. The nave is Early English in style, with traceried windows more typical of the later Decorated Gothic, while the apsidal chevet chapels, ambulatory and sanctuary, are based on French models.

St Patrick's Cathedral became Wardell's life's work and his most notable commission. The original plans remained unaltered during construction, while construction proceeded slowly. The nave and its aisles were completed just ten years later, but the church was not consecrated for use until 1897. At the time of his death in 1899, Wardell was still working on designs for the minor altars and fixtures and fittings. The spires however were not built until 1937–39, and are taller than he envisaged.

The Gothic Bank
Wardell's Venetian Gothic style headquarters for the ES&A Bank (later the ANZ Bank), located in the heart of the financial district on the corner Collins and Queen Streets in Melbourne, is said to be the finest secular Gothic Revival building in Australia. Built between 1883 and 1887, it houses the bank's main branch banking chamber, and a residence above for the bank's Australian manager, Sir George Verdon, who was deeply involved in the design. It cost £77,000, nearly twice the original budget. Where the exterior is restrained, featuring plain ashlar stone wall surfaces broken only by the traceried windows of the chamber and the residence, and notably the Venetian tracery of the first floor loggia, and a slim corner octagonal tower, the interior is elaborate and colourful. The banking chamber structure of a grid of cast iron columns, beams and connecting gothic-styled arches is frankly expressed, and all surfaces above the individually designed gold leaf foliated capitals are elaborately painted in tones of blue with gold leaf highlights. In 1987 it was voted Victoria's favorite building by readers of The Age newspaper.

Government House 

Government House in Melbourne is the largest and grandest Government House, and one of the finest examples of the Italianate style, in Australia. The building includes the official residence of the governor of Victoria, and an enormous ballroom that has been the venue for numerous state and national official functions over its life. Wardell was the chief architect, assisted by J.J. Clark and Peter Kerr; work commenced in 1871 and it was declared open at a ball attended by 1,400 people in 1876. It served for a time as the official residence of the Governor General of Australia after Federation, from 1902 until finally regaining its original use in 1934.

Government House was designed by Wardell in the Victorian Italianate style; its likely inspiration was Queen Victoria's summer residence Osborne House on the Isle of Wight, England, built between 1845 and 1851, inspired by palazzi of the Italian Renaissance, which has similar detailing, picturesque massing, campanile-style towers, and royal associations.

Government House is located on a hill in the centre of parkland just south of the central city, visible from many points around inner Melbourne. It consists of three separately articulated blocks housing different functions, each with their own entrance, asymmetrically arranged with a dominant central tall belvedere tower. The three-storey principal block contains the state rooms for official entertaining, a secondary two-storey wing to the north contains the private apartments of the vice-regal family. The façade of the principal block features columned and pedimented windows indicating the piano nobile, a defining feature of the Italianate style. The two storey ballroom block stretches south of the main block and the tower, and is entered through a large arcaded and columned porte-cochere. The ballroom is said to have been the largest in the British Empire. The interior of Government House is elaborately decorated in contrast to the chaste lines of the exterior.

In Sydney 

Wardell arrived in Sydney in 1878. He designed many buildings, the most notable being St Mary's Cathedral and St John's College at The University of Sydney.

St Mary's Cathedral 

St Mary's Cathedral is slightly larger than St Patrick's Cathedral, and is the largest ecclesiastical building in Australia. Wardell designed the cathedral in the Gothic style. Work began in 1868 while Wardell was still based in Melbourne. Work continued throughout Wardell's lifetime, the cathedral finally being completed in 1928. In 2000 the spires Wardell had intended, a scheme abandoned due to lack of finance, were finally constructed.

St John's College 

In February 1859 Wardell was appointed architect for St John's College. Working from Melbourne, he drew up the general plans and sent them to Sydney in May 1859. Wardell designed St John's College as a three-storeyed sandstone Gothic Revival building on an H-shaped plan but because of budget restrictions with a limit of A£30,000, July and August saw discussion of Wardell's design and of how much could be built within the budget. In September and October the general plans were approved by the St John's Council and the University Senate. During the period from October 1859 to April 1860 relations between Wardell and the Council deteriorated for various reasons, ultimately ending with Wardell's resignation in June 1860.

Other buildings 
The ASN Co building is a large warehouse at 1-5 Hickson Road, The Rocks, Sydney. Designed by Wardell in the Pre-Federation Anglo Dutch style for the Australasian Steam Navigation Company and completed in 1885, it had distinctive Flemish gables and a bell tower, which has ensured it has "long been regarded as a significant Sydney landmark".

Wardell also designed the New South Wales Club House building at 31 Bligh Street in the Victorian Academic Classical style, completed in 1884; and is currently occupied by the Lowy Institute.

Architectural legacy 
Wardell died at his home, Upton Grange, in Edward Street, North Sydney on 19 November 1899 of heart failure and pleurisy. He is buried in the Catholic section of Gore Hill Cemetery. He did not live long enough to see the final finishing touches to St Patrick's Cathedral, and St Mary's Cathedral was far from finished. His legacy to Australia has been to give that country two cathedrals which rank among the finest modern examples of gothic architecture. St Patrick's Cathedral is considered one of the few Australian buildings to be of world significance. However, Wardell's work was more than the design of two cathedrals, his work was versatile and skilful in both the Gothic and classical styles and has given both Sydney and Melbourne some of their most distinguished 19th-century buildings.

The Victorian division of the Australian Institute of Architects honours Wardell by presenting an eponymous annual prize for public architecture.

Gallery

References

Bibliography
 
 De Jong, Ursula M., William Wilkinson Wardell, Monash University Press, Melbourne, 1984.
 Evans, A. G., William Wardell: Building with Conviction, Connor Court, Ballan Vic, 2010.

External links 

 Pictures of St Birinus Church, Henley on Thames
 Picture of Our Lady Star of the Sea, Greenwich

1823 births
1899 deaths
Converts to Roman Catholicism from Anglicanism
19th-century English architects
English engineers
Australian ecclesiastical architects
English ecclesiastical architects
Australian engineers
Gothic Revival architects
Architects from Melbourne
Architects of cathedrals
19th-century Australian architects
English emigrants to colonial Australia
Australian Roman Catholics
Place of birth missing
Burials at Gore Hill Cemetery
0